The Želivka is a river in the Czech Republic, the left tributary of the Sázava River. It originates at the northern slope of the Troják Mountain at the elevation of 677 m. Above Sedlice Reservoir it bears the name Hejlovka. It enters the Sázava River near Zruč nad Sázavou.

Its longest tributary is the Trnava River.

Švihov Reservoir on the Želivka provides water supply for most of the Central Bohemian Region and the city of Prague.

See also
 Želivka Water Tunnel

References

Rivers of the Vysočina Region
Rivers of the Central Bohemian Region